Richard Redwine Gates (born February 3, 1943 in Cincinnati, Ohio) is an American former Olympic sailor in the Star class. He competed in the 1972 Summer Olympics together with Alan Holt, where they finished 10th.

References

Olympic sailors of the United States
American male sailors (sport)
Star class sailors
Sailors at the 1972 Summer Olympics – Star
1943 births
Living people